Roberto Carlos Ortiz Maymi (born December 16, 1984) is a Puerto Rican Major League Baseball (MLB) umpire. He made his debut on May 14, 2016, becoming the first MLB umpire since Delfin Colon to have been born in Puerto Rico. He wears number 40, which was most recently worn by former umpire Jeff Gosney.

During the 2016 season, Ortiz umpired eight games (two as the home plate umpire), and during 2017 he umpired 66 games (14 behind the plate).

See also 
 List of Major League Baseball umpires

References

External links
 

1984 births
Living people
Major League Baseball umpires
People from Caguas, Puerto Rico
Puerto Rican sportspeople